"Woo-Woo" is the B-side' of the 78-rpm jazz instrumental single recorded on February 1, 1939, by Harry James and The Boogie Woogie Trio.

Shortly after leaving Benny Goodman's band and before starting his own band, James entered the studio at the suggestion of Columbia Records producer John Hammond. James was paired with Albert Ammons (on "Woo-Woo") and Pete Johnson (on the flip side's "Boo-Woo"), the two foremost practitioners of boogie-woogie piano, which was enjoying a substantial revival at the time.  They were accompanied by Johnny Williams on bass and Eddie Dougherty on drums. The group recorded four songs during this February 1, 1939, recording session in New York City: "Boo-Woo", "Woo-Woo", "Home, James", and "Jesse".

In the U.S., "Woo-Woo" was released several times over the years by Columbia Records or its subsidiaries:
In 1939 on the B-side of the 78-rpm single on Brunswick 8318 (label matrix #B 24061)
In 1941 on the four-disc, 78-rpm compilation album Boogie Woogie, Columbia C-44 (disc #35958)
In 1952 on the two-disc, 45-rpm compilation EP Boogie Woogie, Columbia B-1611 (disc #5-1360)
In 1955 on the 45-rpm EP Eight to the Valve, Columbia B-2048
In 1955 on the compilation LP Upright And Lowdown, Columbia CL-685
In 2002 on the compilation CD Swingtown'', Sony A 54462, Collectables COL-CD-7450

References

1939 songs
Boogie-woogie songs
Brunswick Records singles